The 1967–68 Boston Celtics season was their 22nd in the National Basketball Association (NBA). The Celtics won their tenth title in franchise history.

Draft picks

This table only displays picks through the second round.

Roster
{| class="toccolours" style="font-size: 95%; width: 100%;"
|-
! colspan="2" style="background-color: #008040;  color: #FFFFFF; text-align: center;" | Boston Celtics 1967–68 roster
|- style="background-color: #FFFFFF; color: #008040;   text-align: center;"
! Players !! Coaches
|- 
| valign="top" |
{| class="sortable" style="background:transparent; margin:0px; width:100%;"
! Pos. !! # !! Nat. !! Name !! Ht. !! Wt. !! From
|-

Regular season

Season standings

Record vs. opponents

Game log

Playoffs

|- align="center" bgcolor="#ccffcc"
| 1
| March 24
| Detroit
| W 123–116
| John Havlicek (25)
| Bill Russell (34)
| Bill Russell (9)
| Boston Garden7,591
| 1–0
|- align="center" bgcolor="#ffcccc"
| 2
| March 25
| @ Detroit
| L 116–126
| Sam Jones (18)
| Bill Russell (14)
| Siegfried, Jones (3)
| Cobo Arena10,109
| 1–1
|- align="center" bgcolor="#ffcccc"
| 3
| March 27
| Detroit
| L 98–109
| John Havlicek (23)
| Bill Russell (23)
| Bill Russell (7)
| Boston Garden8,429
| 1–2
|- align="center" bgcolor="#ccffcc"
| 4
| March 28
| @ Detroit
| W 135–110
| John Havlicek (35)
| Bill Russell (21)
| John Havlicek (9)
| Cobo Arena11,294
| 2–2
|- align="center" bgcolor="#ccffcc"
| 5
| March 31
| Detroit
| W 110–96
| Bailey Howell (30)
| Bill Russell (21)
| John Havlicek (13)
| Boston Garden8,093
| 3–2
|- align="center" bgcolor="#ccffcc"
| 6
| April 1
| @ Detroit
| W 111–103
| John Havlicek (31)
| Bill Russell (23)
| John Havlicek (12)
| Cobo Arena9,483
| 4–2
|-

|- align="center" bgcolor="#ccffcc"
| 1
| April 5
| @ Philadelphia
| W 127–118
| John Havlicek (35)
| Bill Russell (22)
| John Havlicek (11)
| Spectrum14,412
| 1–0
|- align="center" bgcolor="#ffcccc"
| 2
| April 10
| Philadelphia
| L 106–115
| John Havlicek (28)
| Bill Russell (20)
| John Havlicek (9)
| Boston Garden14,780
| 1–1
|- align="center" bgcolor="#ffcccc"
| 3
| April 11
| @ Philadelphia
| L 114–122
| John Havlicek (29)
| Bill Russell (20)
| John Havlicek (8)
| Spectrum15,102
| 1–2
|- align="center" bgcolor="#ffcccc"
| 4
| April 14
| Philadelphia
| L 105–110
| Sam Jones (25)
| Bill Russell (24)
| John Havlicek (8)
| Boston Garden10,503
| 1–3
|- align="center" bgcolor="#ccffcc"
| 5
| April 15
| @ Philadelphia
| W 122–104
| Sam Jones (37)
| Bill Russell (24)
| John Havlicek (10)
| Spectrum15,202
| 2–3
|- align="center" bgcolor="#ccffcc"
| 6
| April 17
| Philadelphia
| W 114–106
| John Havlicek (28)
| Bill Russell (31)
| Havlicek, Siegfried (6)
| Boston Garden14,780
| 3–3
|- align="center" bgcolor="#ccffcc"
| 7
| April 19
| @ Philadelphia
| W 100–96
| Sam Jones (22)
| Bill Russell (26)
| John Havlicek (8)
| Spectrum15,202
| 4–3
|-

|- align="center" bgcolor="#ccffcc"
| 1
| April 21
| Los Angeles
| W 107–101
| Bailey Howell (20)
| Bill Russell (25)
| John Havlicek (8)
| Boston Garden9,546
| 1–0
|- align="center" bgcolor="#ffcccc"
| 2
| April 24
| Los Angeles
| L 113–123
| John Havlicek (24)
| Bill Russell (24)
| Bill Russell (5)
| Boston Garden14,780
| 1–1
|- align="center" bgcolor="#ccffcc"
| 3
| April 26
| @ Los Angeles
| W 127–119
| John Havlicek (27)
| Bill Russell (16)
| Bill Russell (9)
| The Forum17,011
| 2–1
|- align="center" bgcolor="#ffcccc"
| 4
| April 28
| @ Los Angeles
| L 105–118
| Bailey Howell (24)
| Bill Russell (22)
| John Havlicek (8)
| The Forum17,147
| 2–2
|- align="center" bgcolor="#ccffcc"
| 5
| April 30
| Los Angeles
| W 120–117 (OT)
| John Havlicek (31)
| Bill Russell (25)
| John Havlicek (8)
| Boston Garden14,780
| 3–2
|- align="center" bgcolor="#ccffcc"
| 6
| May 2
| @ Los Angeles
| W 124–109
| John Havlicek (40)
| Bill Russell (19)
| John Havlicek (7)
| The Forum17,392
| 4–2
|-

Player statistics

Awards, records and milestones

Awards
Bill Russell, All-NBA Second Team
John Havlicek, All-NBA Second Team

References

 Celtics on Database Basketball
 Celtics on Basketball Reference

Boston Celtics seasons
Boston Celtics
NBA championship seasons
Boston Celtics
Boston Celtics
1960s in Boston